Esteghlal Football Club (Bashgah-e Futbal-e Esteqlâl), commonly known as Esteghlal (meaning 'The Independence'), is an Iranian football club based in capital Tehran, that competes in the Persian Gulf Pro League. The club was founded in 1945 as Docharkheh Savaran (meaning 'The Cyclists') and previously known as Taj (meaning 'The Crown') between 1949 and 1979.

Esteghlal club has a won a total 38 trophies, including the Iranian Leagues 9 times, Iran Championship Cup 1 time, Hazfi Cup a record of 7 times, Iran Super Cup 1 time, Tehran Club Championship a record 13 times, Tehran Hazfi Cup 4 times, Tehran Super Cup a shared record 1 time and Asian Club Championship Iran's record 2 times. Esteghlal is the only Iran club to win an international trophy more than once.

Esteghlal has won 16 Minor Tournaments throughout its history.

This page details Esteghlal Football Club honours and achievements.

Honours

Esteghlal is the most proud team of Iran with 38 official championship titles in provincial, national and continental cups.

Domestic

League

Iran League
 Winners (9): 1970–71, 1974–75, 1989–90, 1997–98, 2000–01, 2005–06, 2008–09, 2012–13, 2021–22
 Runners-up (10): 1973–74, 1991–92, 1994–95, 1998–99, 1999–2000, 2001–02, 2003–04, 2010–11, 2016–17, 2019–20
Iran Championship
 Winners (1): 1957

Cups
Hazfi Cup (record)
 Winners (7): 1976–77, 1995–96, 1999–2000, 2001–02, 2007–08, 2011–12, 2017–18
 Runners-up (6): 1989–90, 1998–99, 2003–04, 2015–16, 2019–20, 2020–21

Super Cup
 Winners (1): 2022
 Runners-up (1): 2018

Provincial (High Level)
Tehran League (record)
 Winners (13): 1949–50, 1952–53, 1956–57, 1957–58, 1959–60, 1960–61, 1962–63, 1968–69, 1970–1971, 1972–73, 1983–84, 1985–86, 1991–92
 Runners-up (7): 1946–47, 1951–52, 1958–59, 1969–70, 1982–83, 1989–90, 1990–91
Tehran Hazfi Cup
 Winners (4): 1946–47, 1950–51, 1958–59, 1960–61
 Runners-up (3): 1945–46, 1957–58, 1969–70
Tehran Super Cup (shared record)
 Winners (1): 1994

Continental
AFC Champions League (Iran record)
 Winners (2): 1970, 1990–91
 Runners-up (2): 1991, 1998–99
 Third place (3): 1971, 2001–02, 2013

Doubles and Treble
Esteghlal has achieved the Double on 5 occasions in its history:

 Iran League and Tehran League
 1957–58 Season
 1970–71 Season

 Tehran League and Tehran Hazfi Cup
 1958–59 Season
 1960–61 Season

 AFC Champions League and Tehran League
 1990–91 Season

Esteghlal has achieved the Treble on 1 occasions in its history:

 AFC Champions League and Iran League and Tehran League
 1970–71 Season

Minor Tournaments

International

 DCM Trophy
Winners (4): 1969, 1970, 1971, 1989
 Bordoloi Trophy
Winners (1): 1989
 Qatar Independence Cup
Winners (1): 1991
 Turkmenistan President's Cup
Winners (1): 1998
 Caspian International Cup
Winners (1): 1998

Domestic
 Taj Cup
Winner (1): 1958
 Doosti Cup
Winners (1): 1972
 Ettehad Cup
Winners (1): 1973
 Basij Festival
Winner (1): 1992
 Iran Third Division
Winner (1): 1993
 Kish Quartet Competition Cup
Winners (1): 1998
 Iranian Football League Cup
Winners (1): 2002
 Solh va Doosti Cup
Winners (1): 2005

References

External links

 
 

Esteghlal F.C.
Football clubs in Iran